Strange Blood is a 2015 science fiction horror film directed and written by Chad Michael Ward and starring Robert Brettenaugh and Alexandra Bard. It received its world premiere on 30 January 2015 in Turkey and in the United States in April 2015.

Plot
Dr. Henry Moorehouse (Robert Brettenaugh) is obsessively determined to find a universal cure for disease. He plans on doing this with an organism known only as 'Ella', a large parasite which he claims can successfully create a vaccine for any virus it's exposed to. Gemma (Alexandra Bard) is Henry’s assistant, who claims to have personally witnessed him going from being a genius doctor to an insane vampiric creature after an experiment gone awry.

Cast
 Robert Brettenaugh as Henry Moorehouse
 Alexandra Bard as Gemma
 James Adam Lim as Det. Joseph Song
 Barbara Breidenbach as Sara
 Rosie Zwaduk as Waitress
 Scott Harders as Private Investigator
 Michelle Gabriela Lamarr as Goth Girl
 David Horn as Bouncer
 Thomas O'Halloran as Jacob Moorehouse
 Anna Harr as Ella Moorehouse
 Ian Whittaker as Fire Inspector

References

External links
 
 

2015 films
2015 horror films
American body horror films
American science fiction horror films
2010s science fiction horror films
Fictional parasites and parasitoids
2010s English-language films
2010s American films